The 2016–17 Assam State Premier League season was to be the second season of the Assam State Premier League since it was reformed in 2015. The season was scheduled to begin on 5 November 2016 and conclude on 8 January 2017.

References

Assam State Premier League
2016–17 in Indian football leagues